Kepler Cheuvreux is an independent European financial services company specializing in research, execution, advisory, and asset management services. Kepler Cheuvreux has 12 offices in Europe, 2 offices in the United States, and 600 employees worldwide.

History

1997: origins 
Kepler Capital Markets was founded in 1997 under the name Julius Baer Brokerage (JBB), a wholly owned subsidiary of Swiss banking group Julius Baer Holding. In 2003, Julius Baer Holding sold JBB to Lightyear Fund, a US private equity firm. JBB then changed its name to Kepler Equities, which Icelandic bank Landsbanki acquired two years later in 2005 to develop a diversified financial services company, including equity, bond, and derivative brokerage, corporate finance, debt and credit investment, and investment solutions. Its name changed to Landsbanki Kepler.

2008: MBO and independence 
Following Landsbanki's bankruptcy in 2008, Kepler Landsbanki was bought out by its employees through an MBO (management buyout) and changed its name to Kepler Capital Markets (KCM). It became independent and focused solely on brokerage activities.

2011: Equity investment by new institutional shareholders 
In 2011, the investment firm BlackFin Capital Partners acquired 47% of KCM's capital, bringing together four institutional shareholders: Caisse des Dépôts, Crédit Mutuel Arkéa, and Banca Leonardo, whose brokerage and research unit was acquired by KCM.

2011 – 2018: Reshaping of the group and formation of strategic alliances in international markets 
The decade was marked by the formation of strategic partnerships allowing the group to develop internationally, starting in 2011 with an alliance between KCM and UniCredit in equity brokerage and equity capital markets, at first in Western Europe and then in Central and Eastern Europe starting in 2012. UniCredit acquired a stake in KCM in 2013.

Two years later, in April 2013, KCM acquired Cheuvreux from Crédit Agricole CIB and re-branded to Kepler Cheuvreux. In December 2013, Kepler Cheuvreux acquired the activities of Derivatives Capital, a French company specializing in structured products for independent financial advisors and private banks, to create a new independent platform in this market.

In the period 2015 – 2018 Kepler Cheuvreux established strategic ECM & research distribution partnerships with Rabobank for the Netherlands, Swedbank for the Nordics and Belfius for Belgium. In the same period, the company signed research distribution agreements with CIMB (Asia), Piper Jaffray (US) and CIBC (Canada). Rabobank, Swedbank, and Belfius also acquired stakes in Kepler Cheuvreux.

2018: Two new major equity shareholders 
Atlas Merchant Capital and Edmond de Rothschild Equity Strategies   (ERES) bought out the stake held by BlackFin Capital Partners, giving them an interest in Kepler Cheuvreux in June 2018 of 20% and 7.7%, respectively. However, 40% of Kepler Cheuvreux's voting rights continue to be controlled by its management and employees.

Activities

Research 
Kepler Cheuvreux's research activity, which includes analyzing financial securities such as equities and bonds, employs more than 120 analysts and covers more than 1,000 companies in Europe.

In June 2015, the company signed a partnership with the Asian investment bank CIMB for reciprocal distribution of their research in their respective markets. Since February 2017, Kepler Cheuvreux has been distributing in Europe the equity research of Piper Jaffray, a US investment bank. In September 2018, the French financial services group exported its research to Canada with a partnership with CIBC.

External surveys such as Extel recognize the quality of the firm's research. In the Extel 2018 survey, Kepler Cheuvreux was ranked 1st for Leading Brokerage Firm – Countries in Europe, 2nd Best Broker for Research (Quoted Companies) and first for Corporate Access.

Execution 
Kepler Cheuvreux's Execution activity processes buy and sell orders in financial securities such as equities, bonds, derivatives, warrants, ETFs and convertible bonds. Using an in-house trading platform acquired in 2013, this activity consists of 12 execution offices, 77 experts, and membership of 103 major global markets.

Kepler Cheuvreux is ranked second in the “Trading & Execution” category of the 2018 Extel survey and first in the “Overall Outperformer in Algorithmic Trading” and “Best Trading Performance” categories by ‘The Trade’ magazine.

Advisory 
Kepler Cheuvreux offers companies advisory services in investment banking & equity capital markets in conjunction with its banking partners (CACIB, UniCredit, Rabobank, Swedbank, and Belfius), investment solutions (creation of structured products), debt services (offering liquidity in the primary and secondary bond markets), and specific services to private banks and retail banking networks.

Asset management 
In 2018, Kepler Cheuvreux diversified its activities into asset management with the acquisition of an asset management company. Renamed KCI, this entity is responsible for developing two activities: one dedicated to preferred equity (financing in the form of mezzanine debt and quasi-equity products) and the other dedicated to private debt in the form of Euro PP and senior debt.

Organization

Shareholders 
Atlas Merchant Capital and Eres   (Edmond de Rothschild Equity Strategies) acquired a stake in Kepler Cheuvreux in June 2018. As an independent company, Kepler Cheuvreux's share ownership was as follows in 2018: Management and employees (25.5%), Atlas Merchant Capital (20.0%), Crédit Agricole CIB (15.1%), UniCredit (10.3%), Eres (7.7%), Swedbank (6%), Caisse Des Dépôts (5.2%), Belfius (5.2%), and Rabobank (5%). Kepler Cheuvreux's management and employees control 40% of the voting rights.

Governance 
Kepler Cheuvreux is a limited company governed by an Executive Board and a Supervisory Board. The supervisory board and the executive board are chaired by Laurent Quirin and Grégoire Varenne, respectively.

Locations 
Kepler Cheuvreux has 14 research offices worldwide: 12 in Europe (Amsterdam, Brussels,   Frankfurt,   Geneva,   London,   Madrid,   Milan,   Oslo,   Paris,   Stockholm, Vienna, and Zurich) and two in the United States (New York and Boston).

References 

Companies established in 1997